Chinese Sign Language (abbreviated CSL or ZGS) is the official sign language of the People's Republic of China. It is unrelated to Taiwanese Sign Language and is known in the Republic of China as Wénfǎ Shǒuyǔ.

History 

The first references to sign language in Chinese literature date from the Tang dynasty, documenting a sign for 'mirror'. In the Song Dynasty, Su Dongpo describes a community that employed a form of sign language. Later in the Ming Dynasty, there is a portrayal of signing in a play entitled Zen Master Yu Has a Dream of Cui Village (also translated A Dream of Master Jade in Green Village) by Xu Wei.

The first Deaf school in China, the Chefoo (Pinyin: Zhīfú, 芝罘, an alternative name of Yantai) School for the Deaf, was established in 1887 by the Presbyterian missionary Annetta Thompson Mills. From the School, a sign language based on an oralist approach to deaf education was developed, coming out of the Milan Conference of 1880. Another school for the deaf was established in Shanghai in 1897 by a French Catholic organization. Chinese Sign Language was grown out of these two bases.

Schools, workshops and farms for the Deaf in diverse locations are the main ways that CSL has been able to spread in China so well. Other deaf people who are not connected to these gathering places tend to use sets of gestures developed in their own homes, known as home sign.

The Chinese National Association of the Deaf was created by deaf people mostly from the United States in 1992. The main reason for the creation of the organization was to raise the quality of living for the deaf, which was behind the quality of living standards provided for other disabled persons. Their main goals are to improve the welfare of the deaf, encourage education about the Deaf and Chinese Sign Language, and promote the needs of the Deaf community in China.

Classification 
There are two main dialects of Chinese Sign Language: Southern CSL (centered on Shanghai and influenced by French Sign Language) and Northern CSL (coming out of the Chefoo School of Deaf and influenced by American Sign Language (ASL)). Northern CSL has the greater influence from Chinese, with for example character puns. Hong Kong Sign Language derives from the southern dialect, but by now is a separate language. The Shanghai dialect is found in Malaysia and Taiwan, but Chinese Sign Language is unrelated to Taiwanese Sign Language (which is part of the Japanese family), Malaysian Sign Language (of the French family), or to Tibetan Sign Language (isolate).

CSL shares morphology for forming negative clauses with British Sign Language; it may be that this is due to historical contact with the British in Shanghai.

Structure 
Like most other sign languages, Chinese Sign Language is mostly conveyed through shapes and motions joined with facial expressions. CSL has at its disposal an alphabetic spelling system similar to pinyin.

The Chinese culture and language heavily influence signs in CSL. For example, there is no generic word for brother in CSL, only two distinct signs, one for "older brother" and one for "younger brother". This parallels Chinese, which also specifies "older brother" or "younger brother" rather than simply "brother". Similarly, the sign for "eat" incorporates a pictorial representation for chopsticks instead of using the hand as in ASL.

References

Sources 
 CSL: Chinese Sign Language 
 About.com article
 Seen Not Heard by Cassie Biggs. From Weekend: February 26–27, 2005 
 Chinese Sign Language: by Elizabeth T. Yeh, 10/28/04

Languages of China
Sign languages of China